Agelena australis is a species of spider in the family Agelenidae, which contains at least 1,315 species of funnel-web spiders . It was first described by Simon in 1896. It is commonly found in South Africa.

References

Endemic fauna of South Africa
australis
Spiders of South Africa
Spiders described in 1896